is a railway station on the Tokyu Den-en-toshi Line extending through Setagaya, Tokyo and Meguro, Tokyo, Japan. It is operated by the private railway operator Tokyu Corporation. Ikejiri-Ōhashi station is the easternmost station in Setagaya. The station number is DT-02.

Station layout
The station consists of two underground side platforms.

Platforms

History
The station opened on April 7, 1977.

References

Railway stations in Tokyo
Railway stations in Japan opened in 1977
Tokyu Den-en-toshi Line
Stations of Tokyu Corporation